The 1921 Northern Illinois State Teachers football team represented Northern Illinois State Teachers College as an independent in the 1921 college football season. They were led by second-year head coach Paul Harrison and played their home games at Glidden Field, located on the east end of campus. The Teachers finished the season with a 3–5 record. Allan Newman was the team's captain.

Schedule

References

Northern Illinois State
Northern Illinois Huskies football seasons
Northern Illinois State Teachers football